The Academy of the Arabic Language  (Arabic: مجمع اللغة العربية Mujma Allugha Al'arabiah;  HaAkademia LaLashon HaAravit) is an institute for the study and research of the Arabic language in Israel.

History
The Academy of the Arabic Language, headquartered in Haifa, was established in December 2007. Among the founders is Sasson Somekh. Its activities are governed by a Knesset Law approved on March 2007 and are largely parallel those of the Hebrew Language Academy. The president of the academy is Prof. Mahmoud Ghanayem.

The academy works to promote: 
 Study of the history of Arabic language 
 Study of the Arabic language: structure, terminology, grammar, lexicon, pronunciation, spelling, reading, writing and orthography including innovations in the language and adaptations stemming from technological developments and advanced computing
 Editing  dictionaries
 Study of Arab culture and literature
 Contact and cooperation with the Hebrew Language Academy and Hebrew and Arabic research institutes in Israel and abroad
 Cooperation with the Ministry of Education and higher education institutions and consultant services 
 Publication of texts and organization of conferences

See also 
 Palestinian Arabic
 List of language regulators

References

External links 

  (in Arabic, Hebrew and English)

Arabic language
Arabic language regulators
Civic and political organizations of Israel
Organizations established in 2007
2007 establishments in Israel